The Yamaha XT225, or known in some markets as the Yamaha Serow, was a dual-sport motorcycle produced by Yamaha from 1986 to 2007. The XT225 was preceded and superseded by the XT250. Power is supplied by a 223cc single-cylinder, air-cooled four-stroke engine featuring a SOHC and 2 valves. The engine produces 15 kW of power and 19Nm of torque. The XT225 has a reputation for being a lightweight dual-purpose motorcycle which is suited to many applications.

(For the origin of the name, see serow.)

External links
http://global.yamaha-motor.com/showroom/cp/collection/serow225_xt225/

References

XT225
Dual-sport motorcycles
Motorcycles introduced in 1986